At the village of Bentalha,  south of Algiers, on the night of 22–23 September 1997, more than 200 villagers (according to Amnesty International) were killed by armed guerrillas. The number of deaths reported ranged from 85 (initial official estimate) to 400 (The Economist) to 417 (independent sources).

Background

In 1997, Algeria was at the peak of a brutal civil conflict that had begun after the military's cancellation of 1992 elections set to be won by the Islamic Salvation Front (FIS). Bentalha, a town a few km south of Baraki (see map), a satellite town of Algiers, voted FIS in the elections, and many inhabitants were initially in favour of the Islamist guerrilla groups which began fighting the government after the elections' cancellation; some joined them.  Initially, the guerrillas in the area belonged to the revived Armed Islamic Movement (MIA) and various independent groups; after 1994, these were integrated into the larger Armed Islamic Group (GIA).  The army had a strong presence in the area, with a post on the eastern entrance of the town, a number of roadblocks, and a barracks on the north side of Baraki. The GIA too had a strong local presence; between 1994 and 1996, they walked the streets of Bentalha openly and killed people associated with the government.  The government established a "Patriot" communal guard of about ten people in Bentalha in June 1996.

On 29 August 1997, about 200 people were killed just a few kilometres to the southeast in the Rais massacre.  Rumors spread that more massacres were coming soon.  For ten days before the event, howling of jackals (which are not found in the area) was heard every night, and helicopters circled overhead daily

Massacre

On 22 September, at 11:30 pm, explosions rocked the Hai el-Djilali neighbourhood on the southwest side of Bentalha, and attackers began pouring in from the orange groves to the neighbourhood's southeast.  They began methodically going from house to house and slaughtering every man, woman, and child they found within.  Screams and alarms filled the air as a helicopter circled overhead.  The attackers were armed with machine guns, hunting rifles, and machetes; some, according to Nesroullah Yous (see below), were dressed in dark combats, some in the Islamists' trademark kachabia, with balaclavas and beards.  They recognised some of the locals, calling them by name.  They proceeded, bashing babies into walls, cutting off limbs, cutting throats, raping, and then killing women.

Meanwhile, according to Amnesty International, "Survivors say that as the massacre took place, armed forces units with armoured vehicles were stationed outside the village and stopped some of those trying to flee from getting out of the village."  This account is corroborated by Yacine, a survivor interviewed by the BBC - who says that "at midnight... army vehicles appeared near the scene, but the soldiers did not intervene" as well as by Nesroullah Yous, who adds that they even stopped locals outside the quarter from coming to their aid.  The killers continued proceeding through Hai el-Djilali from house to house until about 5 am, when they departed unmolested.

A photo later dubbed "The Bentalha Madonna", taken by Hocine Zaourar, circulated widely and won the World Press Photo award in 1997. It showed a grieving Algerian woman waiting outside Zmirli Hospital, and has become an icon of the massacre, comparable to The Falling Soldier of the Spanish civil war.

Responsibility

Responsibility for this massacre and that of Rais was claimed by the Armed Islamic Group in a press release from London on 26 September (according to Agence France-Presse.)  Fouad Boulemia, a leading GIA member, was sentenced to death on 1 August 2004 (for the second time; he had also been found guilty of killing FIS leader Abdelkader Hachani) for involvement in the massacre.  The local GIA leader, Laazraoui, was shot dead in October 1997, as another GIA member, Rachid "Djeha" Ould Hamrane, had been earlier; the latter's sister, Nacira, was imprisoned and was quoted by Le Matin as saying that "At Bentalha, they cut the throats, I collected jewellery from the corpses," adding that "To save the families of the 'terrorists,' I pointed out the homes of sympathizers who should not be massacred."  She is quoted as saying "They told me I must follow the path of my brother, if not they would kill me. Some days before the attack on Bentalha I went to Ouled Allel where there was a meeting but I was with two other women in the kitchen and heard nothing... When they had finished, their chief Laazraoui told us we each had a mission. They told me to go to Bentalha...and point out the houses of our elements, the houses of the terrorists, then look for the jewellery that only women would know where it was hidden... my mother and two other women had the job of stripping the dead of their valuables." (Laazraoui, spelled as Al-Azraoui, is identified by Yous as the local GIA emir from 1995 to 1997, although he claims that none of the survivors recognised Azraoui's men among their attackers.)

However, some have raised questions about the possibility of government involvement, in light of the army's apparent refusal to help.  Most notably, one survivor, Nesroullah Yous, eventually emigrated to France, where he published a book, Qui a tué à Bentalha?, recounting his own experience and arguing that the GIA had been infiltrated and taken over by the Algerian government, possibly following the Tazoult prison escape.  This book was banned in Algeria.  A particularly suggestive element of his account is the words he claims to have heard the guerrillas saying, suggesting that they knew the soldiers stationed outside would do nothing, and cared little for religion:

 "The soldiers won't help you!  We have the whole night to rape your women and children, drink your blood.  Even if you escape today, we'll come back tomorrow to finish you off!  We're here to send you to your God!"

He does not claim to have seen certain evidence of the killers' identity but feels that the circumstantial evidence for government involvement is overwhelming.  Hugh Roberts summarises the latter:

 "how the authorities refused requests from Bentalha's residents for arms with which to defend themselves; how the security forces treated the local Islamist groups with a degree of indulgence that the civilian populations found incomprehensible; how, on the night of the massacre, most of the members of the local 'patriot' militia had been sent away for some relaxation in a coastal resort on the orders of the local army commander; how, during the massacre itself, the security forces were stationed on the edge of Bentalha and were aware of what was going on; how the neighbourhood of Haï El-Djilali, where Yous himself lived and which was specifically targeted by the attack, was repeatedly illuminated by huge projectors recently installed in a nearby field by the police, as if to light the attackers' way; how a military helicopter hovered over the scene throughout much of the six hours that the massacre lasted; how troops manning the roadblock at the entrance to Bentalha stopped civilians from nearby villages from coming to the rescue and even reportedly shot dead a policeman who tried to do his duty in this respect; and how the assailants were allowed to stroll out of Bentalha and escape down the main road south, the security forces making no attempt to intercept them, although well placed to do so."

Opponents of this position argue that the question of "who kills?" is obscene and that the murderers are known to be Islamist guerrillas; for instance, Zazi Sadou of the Algerian Assembly of Women for Democracy claims in Communalism Combat, April 1998 that:

 "The leaders of the massacre in Bentalha are known to everyone. They are Laazaraoui and Ould Hamrane, whose sister Nacera, also a terrorist, was arrested the day after the massacre by the patriots in the village... Together with other women, she took part in the massacre and was responsible for identifying which families should be murdered and the accomplices who should be spared. Later, she and the other women looted the gold and cash of their victims. On the day of her arrest, her testimony was made public before photographers and the press. The majority of the terrorists identified by the inhabitants of Hai Rais, Bentalha, Larbaa, Sidi Moussa, are activists of the FIS".

Likewise, Yous and Habib Souaidia were denounced by Algerian TV on 16 April 2001 as "those who would profit from this confusion in wanting to exonerate the armed groups and discredit the State institutions which had saved the country from fundamentalist barbarism."

Among Western academics too, the question has proved controversial.  Hugh Roberts, for instance, says that "Qui a tué à Bentalha? drives a coach-and-four through the [holes in the] official version by recounting in detail the events which preceded the massacre as well as the massacre itself", although he also notes that "He suggests that they may have been a special commando or death-squad, and this suggestion has attained a large currency in recent years. It has to be said, however, that he does not and arguably could not establish this for a fact."  On the other hand, Bernard-Henri Lévy calls it "troubling, but not convincing."

See also
List of Algerian massacres of the 1990s
List of massacres in Algeria

References

External links
 ArabicNews
 Dossier: Le massacre de Bentalha
 Fighting the fanatics - a letter
 Je sais qui a tué: Temoignages sur Bentalha reçues par l'association Djazairouna de Blida
 Le Matin
 Le Monde
 Survivor's account of mass murder
 The Economist

Algerian massacres of the 1990s
1997 in Algeria
Conflicts in 1997
Massacres in 1997
September 1997 events in Africa